Šaban Šaulić (6 September 1951 – 17 February 2019) was a Serbian and former Yugoslavian folk singer. Renowned for his refined baritone vocals and performances characterised by emotional intensity and crowd interaction, his career spanning over five decades has enjoyed both critical and commercial success. He is referred to as the "King of Folk Music" ("kralj narodne muzike").

Life and career

Early life
Šaban Šaulić was born on 6 September 1951 in Šabac, PR Serbia, FPR Yugoslavia to Bosniak parents Huso Šaulić and Ilduza (née Demirović). His mother Ilduza was originally from Bijeljina, Bosnia and Herzegovina where he spent his childhood. Šaban had a sister, Sarajka, who took care of him growing up, and a half sister from his father's previous relationship.

Šaulić initially showed an interest and affinity for football. It was his uncle, Alija, however, who first noticed that his nephew's true talent laid in music. In the mid-1960s, Alija asked his nephew to sing at their local kafana, which marked the start of Šaulić's five decade long musical career.

Career
In 1969, at the age of 18, Šaulić recorded his first single Dajte mi utjehu ("Give me Solace"). The song became an instant hit and led Šaulić to relocate to Belgrade, Serbia so that he could continue working on what was promising to be a successful career. By the mid-70s, Šaulić had become a household name and his songs were much requested in kafane.

Šaulić was also a judge on the televised singing competition Zvezde Granda between 2013 and 2016, and the televised singing competition "Pinkove zvezde" in 2016–2017 season.

Discography

Studio albums

Dajte mi utjehu (1969)
Bio sam pijanac (1972)
Tužno vetri gorom viju (1974)
Ne pitaj me kako mi je druže (1975) 
Gore pisma svedoci ljubavi (1976)
Dođi da ostarimo zajedno (1978)
Dva galeba bela (1979)
Ponovo smo na početku sreće (1980)
Meni je s tobom sreća obećana (1981)
Sve sam s' tobom izgubio (1982)
Tebi ne mogu da kažem ne (1984)
Kafanska noć (1985)
Kad bi čaša znala (1986)
Biseri Narodne Muzike (1986)
Kralj boema / Verujem u ljubav (1987)
Samo za nju (1988)
Ljubav je velika tajna (1988)
Ljubav je pesma i mnogo više (1989)
Pomozi mi, druže, pomozi mi, brate (1990)
Anđeoska vrata (1992)
Ljubavna drama (1994)
Volim da volim (1995)
Tebi koja si otišla (1996)
Od srca (1996)
Ljubav je slatka robija (1997)
Tebe da zaboravim (1998)
Za novi milenijum (2000)
Nema ništa, majko, od tvoga veselja (2001)
Kralj i sluga (2002)
Šadrvani (2003)
Album 2004 (hitovi + 2 nove pjesme: "Postelja" i "Sa njom sve") (2004)
Telo uz telo (2005)
Bogati siromah (2006)
Milicu Stojan voleo (2008)

Compilation albums
Balade
Najlepše pesme

Personal
In 1974, Šaulić married his wife, Gordana (b. 1958). The pair briefly separated in 1985, during which Šaulić wrote and dedicated the song "Gordana" to her. Šaulić and his wife reconciled after just 20 days. Together, they had three children; a son, Mihajlo, and two daughters, Sanela and Ilda. Ilda is also a singer.

Prior to his marriage to Gordana, Šaulić had a son out of wedlock, named Robert, who he acknowledged and provided financial support for until Robert turned 18.

Šaulić's father died unexpectedly during Šaban's concert tour in Australia. He was not able to attend his father's funeral which was held the very next day. Šaulić would often express how he would never be able to come to terms with the fact that he was not in attendance.

Death
In the early morning hours of 17 February 2019, following a concert the night before in Bielefeld, Germany, Šaulić was on his way home, being driven to the Düsseldorf Airport for a flight back to Belgrade. His best man, Boban Stojadinović, was a fellow passenger in the back seat of the car driven by the singer's keyboardist, Mirsad Kerić, who had accompanied him to the concert. 

At approximately 06:50 am, on the Bundesautobahn 2 between Bielefeld and Gütersloh, the SEAT Ibiza that Šaulić was in was violently struck from behind by a Mazda vehicle driven by a drunk driver without a driver's license, causing serious injuries to the three individuals in it. All three were rushed to the hospital, where Šaulić and Kerić were later pronounced dead.

The news of Šaulić's death was met with widespread shock and sorrow from his colleagues and fans. He was buried on 22 February 2019 in the Alley of Distinguished Citizens at the Belgrade New Cemetery.

In February 2020, Šaulić was posthumously awarded the Golden Medal of Merits of the Republic of Serbia.

Due to Šaulić's public profile and popularity, the circumstances of his death in Germany became a big story in his home country Serbia as well as the rest of the countries formerly a part of Yugoslavia with the driver that caused the deadly accident quickly identified in the Serbian media as a German national of Turkish origin and no fixed address, along with his identifying information published—including his name, age, and social media photos. The German authorities placed the perpetrator in an 11-week prison detention awaiting trial on four separate charges: two counts of involuntary negligent manslaughter, one count of negligently causing severe bodily harm, drunk driving with traces of cannabis in his system, and driving without a license. Assessed by a German judge not to be a flight risk, the accused was released from detention at the expiration of 11 weeks.

The trial that kept getting postponed due to the COVID-19 pandemic was finally held in January 2022, almost three years after the deadly incident. As part of the expert analysis during the trial, it was determined that the accused was driving at the speed in the 156-193 km/h range (on the road with an 80 km/h speed limit) when he made impact with the car Šaulić was in that had been moving at the speed of 72-92km/h. The accused received a 3 year and 3 month sentence. On appeal, in October 2022, his sentence was reduced by 3 months to 3 years.

See also
Music of Serbia
List of singers from Serbia
Serbian folk music

References

1951 births
2019 deaths
Grand Production artists
Serbian baritones
Serbian folk musicians
21st-century Serbian male singers
Bosniaks of Serbia
Serbian turbo-folk singers
Musicians from Šabac
Road incident deaths in Germany
20th-century Serbian male singers
Yugoslav male singers